Agatsuma Entertainment (アガツマ・エンタテインメント) was a Japanese video game publishing company established in 1997. It mainly published titles for the Nintendo DS, Wii, and Nintendo 3DS platforms.  They also had an agency business, coordinating deals between developers and publishers worldwide.  The company dissolved on December 11, 2015 and fully liquidated on March 31, 2016.

Works published

References

Web site 
Company's website

Video game publishers
Video game companies established in 1997
Video game companies disestablished in 2015
Defunct video game companies of Japan
Japanese companies established in 1997
Japanese companies disestablished in 2015